Goldstein (() is a surname of Yiddish origin, that is widespread among Ashkenazi Jews. It translates to "gold stone" in English. Notable people with the surname include:

Arts 
 Adam Goldstein (1973–2009), American musician and disc jockey known as DJ AM
 Alisa M. Goldstein, American genetic epidemiologist 
 Boris Goldstein (1922–1987), Soviet violinist
 Brett Goldstein (born 1980), British actor and comedian
 Chaim Itsl Goldstein (born 1900), Polish author
 Doug Goldstein (born 1971), American TV screenwriter, producer and director
 Elliot Goldstein (born 1938), American actor known as Elliott Gould
 Fanny Goldstein (librarian) (1895–1961)
 Harvey Goldstein (born 1944), American bass guitarist known as Harvey Brooks
 Jack Goldstein, (1945–2003), Canadian-American performance and conceptual artist
 Jack Goldstein (born 1986), vocalist for the British band Fixers
 Jean-Isidore Goldstein (1925–2007), Romanian-French poet known as Isidore Isou
 Jenette Goldstein (born 1960), American actress
 Jerry Goldstein (producer) (born 1940)
 Johnny Goldstein (born 1991), Israeli musician 
 Jonathan Goldstein (1968–2019), British composer
 Jonathan Goldstein (actor) (born 1964)
 Jonathan Goldstein (author) (born 1969)
 Jonathan Goldstein (filmmaker) (born 1968)
 Lisa Goldstein (born 1953), American fantasy and science fiction writer
 Lisa Goldstein (rabbi) (born 1965)
 Lisa Goldstein (actress) (born 1981)
 Martha Goldstein (1919–2014), American harpsichordist and pianist
 Marvin Goldstein (born 1950), American pianist
 Mikhail Goldstein (1917–1989), composer and violinist
 Philip Goldstein (1913–1980), American painter known as Philip Guston
 Robert Goldstein (1903 - 1974), film producer
 Róza Goldstein (1832–1892), Hungarian mezzo-soprano known as Róza Csillag
 Shaike Goldstein-Ophir (1928–1987), Israeli actor, comedian and screenwriter known as Shaike Ophir
 Sokher Goldstein (1859–1887), Romanian singer and actor
 Sophie Goldstein (1861–1904), Romanian actress known as Sophia Karp

Religion 
 Clifford Goldstein (born 1955), Seventh-day Adventist author and editor
 Herbert S. Goldstein (1890–1970), American Orthodox rabbi
Isabella Goldstein (1849–1916), Australian suffragist and social reformer
 Jonathan A. Goldstein (1929–2004), American biblical scholar
 Josef Goldstein (1836–1899), Austro-Hungarian cantor
 Joseph Goldstein (writer) (born 1944)
 Lisa Goldstein (rabbi) 
 Nachman Goldstein (1825–1894), (aka Tcheriner Rav), Ukrainian rabbi
 Samuel Goldstein (rabbi) (1852–1935)
 Warren Goldstein (born 1971), Chief Rabbi of South Africa

Sport 
 Abe Goldstein (1898–1977), American bantamweight boxer
 Danielle Goldstein (born 1985), American-Israeli show jumper
 Don Goldstein (1937-2022), American basketball player
 Jørn Goldstein (born 1953), Norwegian Olympic ice hockey goalie
 Leo Goldstein, American-Israeli soccer referee
 Lonnie Goldstein (1918–2013), American baseball player
 Margie Goldstein-Engle (born 1958), American equestrian
 Omer Goldstein (born 1996), Israeli cyclist
 Paul Goldstein (tennis) (born 1976), American tennis player
 Ralph Goldstein (1913–1997), American Olympic épée fencer
 Roy Goldstein (born 1993), Israeli cyclist 
 Ruby Goldstein (1907–1984), American welterweight boxer
 Samuel Goldstein (1945–1977), American Paralympian
 Shulamit Goldstein (born 1968), Israeli Olympic rhythmic gymnast
 Steven Goldstein (racing driver) (born 1981), Colombian racing driver
 Todd Goldstein (born 1988), Australian rules footballer

Other 
 Abraham Samuel Goldstein (1925–2005), Dean of Yale Law School
 Adam Goldstein (author) (born 1988)
 Al Goldstein (1936–2013), American pornographer
 Andy Goldstein (born 1973), British broadcaster
 Baruch Goldstein (1956–1994), Israeli mass murderer
 Bernard R. Goldstein (born 1938), historian of science 
 Bruce Goldstein (born 1951), American film programmer, producer, archivist, historian
 Chris Goldstein, American radio personality
 Daniel Goldstein (born 1969), American psychologist
 Emmanuel Goldstein (born 1959), pen name of Eric Gordon Corley, American hacker
 Eugen Goldstein (1850–1930), German physicist, and an early researcher in X-rays
 Harvey Goldstein (1939–2020), British statistician 
 Herbert Goldstein (1922–2005), American physicist
 Herman Goldstein (1931–2020), American criminologist
 Ivo Goldstein (born 1958), Croatian historian
 Jay Goldstein, American kidnapper
 Jerry Goldstein (physicist) (born 1970)
 Jonathan L. Goldstein (born 1941), American lawyer
 Joseph I. Goldstein (1939–2015), American engineer
 Joseph L. Goldstein (born 1940), American Nobel Prize–winning biochemist
 Joshua S. Goldstein (born 1952), American scientist
 Joyce Goldstein (born 1935), American chef
 Kurt Goldstein (1878–1965), German neurologist and psychiatrist 
 Leon M. Goldstein (died 1999), American President of Kingsborough Community College, and acting Chancellor of the City University of New York
 Louis L. Goldstein (1913–1998), American politician 
 Marcus Goldstein (1906–1997), American anthropologist 
 Martin Goldstein (1905–1941), American gangster
 Matthew Goldstein (born 1941), Chancellor of the City University of New York
 Max Goldstein (1898–1924), Romanian communist
 Max A. Goldstein (1870–1941), American otolaryngologist
 Mel Goldstein (1945–2012), American meteorologist
 Melvyn Goldstein (born 1938), American social anthropologist
 Paul Goldstein (law professor) (born 1943)
 Peter Goldstein, British businessman
 Phil Goldstein (born 1950), American magician known as Max Maven
 Phillip Goldstein (investor)
 Rebecca Goldstein (born 1950), American novelist and professor of philosophy
 Reuben Goldstein (1862–1943), British businessman and manufacturer known as Reuben Goldstein Edwards
 Richard Goldstein (astronomer) (born 1927)
 Robin Goldstein (born 1976), American author and wine critic
 Sam Goldstein, Canadian politician
 Slavko Goldstein (1928–2017), Croatian historian
 Solomon Goldstein (1884–1968), Bulgarian Communist politician
 Solomon Goldstein-Rose (born 1993), American politician 
 Steve Goldstein (broadcaster)
 Steve Goldstein (diplomat)
 Steven Goldstein (activist)
 Steven R. Goldstein, American gynecologist 
 Sydney Goldstein (1903–1989), British mathematician and aerodynamicist
 Tom Goldstein (born 1970), American attorney 
 Vida Goldstein (1869–1949), Australian suffragette and social reformer
 Warren Goldstein (professor)
 Yisroel Goldstein, American shooting survivor
 Yoine Goldstein (1934–2020), Canadian lawyer and politician

Variant surnames
 Aleksandar Goldštajn (1912–2010), prominent Croatian university professor, law scholar and constitutional court judge
 Israel Goldstine (1898–1953), New Zealand politician, businessman, barrister and solicitor

Fictional

 Anthony Goldstein, a minor character in the Harry Potter book series
 Emmanuel Goldstein, a key character in George Orwell's novel Nineteen Eighty-Four
 Ira Goldstein, a character who appears in ASB Bank's commercials
 Koko Goldstein, a character in the Web video series Yacht Rock
 Rachel Goldstein in Water Rats
 Porpentina and Queenie Goldstein, sisters in Fantastic Beasts and Where to Find Them (film)
 Ivan Goldstein in Missions (TV series)

See also
 Goldstone (disambiguation)
 Goldstine

German-language surnames
Jewish surnames
Yiddish-language surnames
Surnames from ornamental names